is a dam in the village of Ikusaka, Nagano Prefecture, Japan, completed in 1964.

Images

See also 

 List of dams and reservoirs in Japan

References 

Dams in Nagano Prefecture
Dams completed in 1964
Gravity dams